There have been several Colombian Civil Wars in Colombian history:
War of the Supremes (1839–1841)
Colombian Civil War of 1851
Colombian Civil War of 1854
Colombian Civil War (1860–1862)
Colombian Civil War of 1876
Colombian Civil War (1884–1885)
Colombian Civil War of 1895
Thousand Days' War (1899–1902)
La Violencia (1948–1958)
Colombian conflict (1964–present)

See also
List of wars involving Colombia

Civil wars involving the states and peoples of South America
Military history of Colombia